Spain competed at the 1988 Summer Olympics in Seoul, South Korea. 229 competitors, 200 men and 29 women, took part in 130 events in 24 sports. At the closing ceremony, a short Catalan segment was performed on a part of the Olympic Stadium, as the country hosted the next Olympics in Barcelona.

As of 2021, this is the most recent time that Spain did not win at least eleven medals or three gold medals.

Medalists

|  style="text-align:left; width:78%; vertical-align:top;"|

| width="22%" align="left" valign="top" |

Competitors
The following is the list of number of competitors in the Games.

Archery

No member of the Spanish archery delegation advanced past the preliminary round.

Women's Individual Competition:
 Teresa Valdés – Preliminary round, 57th place

Men's Individual Competition:
 Antonio Vazquez – Preliminary Round (→ 32nd place)
 Manuel Francisco Jiménez – Preliminary Round (→ 50th place)
 Juan Carlos Holgado – Preliminary Round (→ 52nd place)

Men's Team Competition:
 Vazquez, Jiménez, and Holgado – Preliminary Round (→ 17th place)

Athletics

Men's 10.000 metres 
 Antonio Prieto 
 First Round — 28:22.52
 Final — 27:52.78 (→ 10th place)

 Antonio Serrano 
 First Round — 29:01.13 (→ did not advance)

 José Manuel Albentosa 
 First Round — did not finish (→ did not advance)

Men's Marathon 
 Alfonso Abellán 
 Final — 2:31:10 (→ 64th place)

 Honorato Hernández
 Final — DNF

Men's Long Jump 
 Antonio Corgos
 Qualification — 7.88m
 Final — 8.03m (→ 5th place)

Men's Decathlon 
 Antonio Peñalver — 7753 points (→ 23rd place) 
 100 metres — 11.38s
 Long Jump — 7.08m
 Shot Put — 14.31m
 High Jump — 2.00m
 400 metres — 50.24s
 110m Hurdles — 14.97s
 Discus Throw — 46.34m
 Pole Vault — 4.40m
 Javelin Throw — 55.68m
 1.500 metres — 4:32.68s

Men's 20 km Walk
 José Marín
 Final — 1:20:34 (→ 4th place)

 Daniel Plaza
 Final — 1:21:53 (→ 12th place)

 Ricardo Pueyo
 Final — 1:23:40 (→ 23rd place)

Men's 50 km Walk
 José Marín
 Final — 3'43:03 (→ 5th place)

 Jorge Llopart
 Final — 3'48:09 (→ 13th place)

 Manuel Alcalde
 Final — 3'59:13 (→ 25th place)

Women's 4 × 400 m Relay 
 Blanca Lacambra, Esther Lahoz, Cristina Pérez, Maite Zuñiga 
 Heat — did not start (→ did not advance)

Women's 10.000 metres 
 Ana Isabel Alonso
 Final — 32:40.50 (→ 25th place)

Basketball

Men's tournament

Team roster

Group play

Quarterfinals

Classification round 5–8

Classification round 7/8

Boxing

Men's Light Flyweight (– 48 kg) 
 Antonio Caballero 
 First Round — Bye
 Second Round — Lost to Dang Nieu Hu (VIE), RSC-2

Men's Flyweight (– 51 kg) 
 Bonifacio García
 First Round — Lost to Nokuthula Tshabangu (ZIM), 1:4

Light Welterweight (– 63.5 kg)
 Tomás Ruiz
 First Round — Lost to Mark Elliot (GBR), 1:4

Men's Welterweight (– 67 kg)
 Javier Martínez
 First Round — Bye
 Second Round — Win to Lucas Januario (MOZ), 5:0
 Third Round — Lost to Adewale Adgebusi (NGA), 0:5

Heavyweight (– 91 kg)
 José Ortega
 First Round — Lost to Gyula Alvics (HUN), 0:5

Canoeing

Men's C-1 500 metres
 Narcisco Suárez
 Heat – 1st (heat-2)
 Semifinal – 1:55.98
 Final – 2:01.33 (→ 7th place)

Men's C-1 1000 metres
 Francisco López
 Heat – 4:16.02
 Repechage; 4:22.34
 Semifinal – 4:16.90 (→ did not advance)

Men's C-2 500 metres
 Enrique Míguez and Narcisco Suárez
 Heat – 1:48.75 	
 Semifinal – 1:50.63 (→ did not advance) 	

Men's K-1 500 metres
 Francisco Leal
 Heat – 1:47.71
 Semifinal – 1:46.93 (→ did not advance) 	

Men's K-1 1000 metres
 José Reyes Rodríguez
 Heat – 3:59.95 	
 Repechage – 3:53.39
 Semifinal – 3:48.35 (→ did not advance) 	

Men's K-2 500 metres
 Fernando Fuentes and Juan Manuel Sánchez 
 Heat – 1:36.17
 Repechage – 1:40.09
 Semifinal – 1:36.22 (→ did not advance) 	

Men's K-2 1000 metres
 Alberto Sánchez (canoeist) and Gregorio Vicente
 Heat – 3:32.97
 Repechage – 3:32.92 (→ did not advance) 	

Men's K-4 1000 metres
 Juan Manuel Sánchez, Fernando Fuentes, Francisco Javier Álvarez, and Juan José Román
 Heat – 3:06.96
 Repechage – 3:16.79
 Semifinal – 3:13.88 (→ did not advance)

Cycling

Thirteen cyclists, all male, represented Spain in 1988.

Men's road race
 Eduardo Manrique
 Gonzalo Aguiar
 Iván Alemany

Men's team time trial
 Javier Aldanondo
 Javier Carbayeda
 Arturo Gériz
 José Rodríguez

Men's sprint
 José Moreno

Men's 1 km time trial
 Bernardo González

Men's individual pursuit
 José Antonio Martiarena

Men's team pursuit
 Bernardo González
 Xavier Isasa
 José Antonio Martiarena
 Agustín Sebastiá

Men's points race
 Antonio Salvador

Diving

Men's 3m Springboard
José Miguel Gil
 Preliminary Round — 483.12 (→ did not advance, 25th place)

Men's 10m Springboard
Emilio Ratia
 Preliminary Round — 425.73 (→ did not advance, 25th place)

Equestrianism

Equestrians
 Luis Antonio Álvarez
 Luis Astolfi
 José Ramón Beca 
 Alfredo Fernández-Duran
 Juan Diego García
 Juan Félix Matute
 Santiago de la Rocha
 Pedro Sánchez

Fencing

Eight fencers, all men, represented Spain in 1988.

Men's foil
 Andrés García
 Jesús Esperanza

Men's épée
 Ángel Fernández
 Fernando de la Peña
 Manuel Pereira

Men's team épée
 Ángel Fernández, Oscar Fernández, Raúl Maroto, Fernando de la Peña, Manuel Pereira

Men's sabre
 Antonio García

Gymnastics

Men's events
 Alvaro Montesinos
 Alfonso Rodríguez de Sadia
 Miguel Ángel Rubio

Women's events
 Núria Belchi
 Lidia Castillejo
 Nuria García
 Manuela Hervás
 Laura Muñoz
 Eva María Rueda

Handball

 Team roster
 Juan Javier Cabanas
 Jesús Ángel Fernández
 Jaume Fort
 Jesús Gómez
 Ricardo Marín
 Juan Francisco Muñoz
 Juan Alfonso de la Puente
 Jaime Puig
 Javier Reino
 Lorenzo Rico
 Julián Ruiz
 Juan Sagalés
 Eugenio Serrano
 Juan José Uría
 Miguel Ángel Zúñiga
Head coach: Juan de Dios Román

Hockey

Men's team competition
Preliminary round (group A)
 Spain – Pakistan 1-5
 Spain – Netherlands 1-1
 Spain – Kenya 4-2
 Spain – Argentina 0-1
 Spain – Australia 0-1
Classification Matches
 9th/12th place: Spain – Canada 2-0
 9th/10th place: Spain – South Korea 2-0 (→ 9th place)

Team roster
 Jaime Armengol
 Ignacio Escudé
 Jaime Escudé
 Javier Escudé
 Eduardo Fàbregas
 Juan de Dios García-Mauriño
 Andreu Gómez
 Santiago Grau
 José Antonio Iglesias
 Joaquín Malgosa
 Juan Malgosa
 Jordi Oliva
 Miguel de Paz
 Miguel Ortego
 Juan Carlos Peón
 Miguel Rovira

Judo

Modern pentathlon

Three male pentathletes represented Spain in 1988.

Men's Individual Competition:
 Eduardo Quesada – 4852 pts (→ 32nd place)
 Leopoldo Centeno – 4814pts (→ 38th place)
 Jorge Quesada – 0pt (→ 64th place)

Men's Team Competition:
 Quesada, Centeno, and Quesada – 9666pts (→ 19th place)

Rhythmic gymnastics

 María Isabel Lloret (→ 5th)
 María Martín Rodríguez (→ 20th)

Rowing

Sailing

Men

Women

Open

Shooting

Men

Women

Open

Swimming

Men's 200m Freestyle
 Daniel Serra
 Heat – 1:53.05 (→ did not advance, 28th place)

Men's 400m Freestyle
 Daniel Serra
 Heat – 3:57.46 (→ did not advance, 22nd place)

Men's 100m Backstroke
 Martin López-Zubero
 Heat – 58.06 (→ did not advance, 23rd place)

Men's 200m Backstroke
 Martin López-Zubero
 Heat – 2:03.33
 B-Final – 2:03.70 (→ 11th place)

Men's 100m Breaststroke
 Joaquín Fernández
 Heat – 1:05.19 (→ did not advance, 32nd place)

 Sergi López
 Heat – 1:06.08 (→ did not advance, 43rd place)

Men's 200m Breaststroke
 Sergi López
 Heat – 2:17.06
 Final – 2:15.21 (→  Bronze Medal)

 Joaquín Fernández
 Heat – 2:20.34 (→ did not advance, 24th place)

Men's 100m Butterfly
 José Luis Ballester
 Heat – 55.27 (→ did not advance, 18th place)

Men's 200m Butterfly
 José Luis Ballester
 Heat – 2:03.32 (→ did not advance, 24th place)

Men's 200m Individual Medley
 Martin López-Zubero
 Heat – 2:10.52 (→ did not advance, 31st place)

 Sergi López
 Heat – 2:13.48 (→ did not advance, 36th place)

Men's 200m Individual Medley
 Martin López-Zubero
 Heat – 4:35.68 (→ did not advance, 27th place)

Men's 4 × 100 m Medley Relay
 Martin López-Zubero, Ramón Camallonga, José Luis Ballester, and José Hernando
 Heat – 3:49.47 (→ did not advance, 12th place)

Women's 200m Breaststroke
 Silvia Parera
 Heat – 2:35.57 (→ did not advance, 18th place)

Women's 100m Butterfly
 María Luisa Fernández
 Heat – 1:02.47 (→ did not advance, 17th place)

Women's 200m Individual Medley
 Silvia Parera
 Heat – 2:22.20 (→ did not advance, 21st place)

Women's 4 × 100 m Medley Relay
 Natalia Autric, Silvia Parera, María Luisa Fernández, and Amaia Garbayo
 Heat – 4:21.84 (→ did not advance, 13th place)

Synchronized swimming

Three synchronized swimmers represented Spain in 1988.

Women's solo
 Eva López
 Marta Amorós
 Núria Ayala

Women's duet
 Eva López
 Núria Ayala

Tennis

Men's Singles Competition
 Javier Sánchez
 First round — Defeated Sadiq Abdullahi (Nigeria) 6-2 7-5 6-3
 Second round — Defeated Grant Connell (Canada) 6-4 6-4 6-2
 Third round — Lost to Paolo Canè (Italy) 6-7 6-4 1-6 2-6

 Emilio Sánchez
 First round — Defeated Shuzo Matsuoka (Japan) 6-3 6-4 6-3
 Second round — Lost to Paolo Canè (Italy) 5-7 3-6 7-6 4-6

 Sergio Casal
 First round — Defeated Mark Gurr (Zimbabwe) 6-2 6-3 6-1
 Second round — Defeated Leonardo Lavalle (Mexico) 6-3 6-4 7-6
 Third round — Lost to Michiel Schapers (Netherlands) 4-6 6-4 6-2 3-6 4-6

Men's Doubles Competition
 Emilio Sánchez and Sergio Casal →  Silver Medal
 First Round – Defeated Andrei Olhovskiy and Alexander Volkov (Soviet Union) 6-3 6-3 6-1 
 Second Round – Defeated Alex Antonitsch and Horst Skoff (Austria) 6-4 6-2 6-1 
 Quarterfinals – Defeated Goran Ivanišević and Slobodan Živojinović (Yugoslavia) 6-1 7-6 6-3  
 Semifinals – Defeated Stefan Edberg and Anders Järryd (Sweden) 6-4 1-6 6-3 6-2
 Final – Lost to Ken Flach and Robert Seguso (USA) 3-6 4-6 7-6 7-6 7-9

Water polo

Men's tournament
 Preliminary round (Group B)
 Defeated China (13-6)
 Defeated United States (9-7)
 Drew with Hungary (6-6)
 Lost to Yugoslavia (8-10)
 Defeated Greece (12-9)
 Classification round (Group D)
 Lost to Australia (7-8)
 Defeated Italy (11-9) → 6th place

 Team roster
 Jesús Rollán
 Miguel Chillida
 Marco Antonio González
 Miguel Pérez
 Manuel Estiarte
 Pere Robert
 Jorge Payá
 José Antonio Rodriguez
 Jordi Sans
 Salvador Gómez
 Mariano Moya
 Jorge Neira
 Pedro Francisco García
Head coach: Antonio Esteller

Weightlifting

Wrestling

References

External links
 Spanish Olympic Committee

Nations at the 1988 Summer Olympics
1988
Olympics